Florida's 34th House District elects one member of the Florida House of Representatives. Its current representative since 2016 is Ralph Massullo.
This district is located in Central West Florida, in the northern Tampa Bay Area, including the cities of Inverness and Crystal River .
The district currently covers the entirety of Citrus and the northwest part of Hernando counties.

Representatives 1967 - present

See also 

 Florida's 10th congressional district
 Florida's 11th congressional district

References

34
Citrus County, Florida
Hernando County, Florida